Aíbinn (modern spelling: Aíbhinn) is an Irish language female given name.

Bearers of the name

 Aíbinn ingen Donnchadha, died 950.
 Aíbinn ingen Duinn Oilen, died 1014.
 Aíbinn Ní Conchobhair, died 1066.

See also
List of Irish-language given names

External links
 Aibinn at medievalscotland.org

Irish-language feminine given names